PT Gayamakmur Lestari  (GML) is an Indonesian company, founded in 2011 which specialize of material handling and conveyor system. It is owned by the Lie brothers, which founded Gaya Makmur Group (GM Group).

GML, started business by supplying conveyor belts, mostly for industrial and mining needs with base in Jakarta. By 2013, it has grown to material handling specialist with clients spread over Indonesia. Besides Indonesia, GM Groups has expanded its business to overseas such as Singapore, Thailand and China.GM Groups business unit including tractors, heavy duty trucks, civil construction, auto parts mechanical parts, and also plantation.

References

Logistics companies of Indonesia
Companies based in Jakarta
Companies established in 2011